The Live Mix, Part 2 is an album by Breakestra, an American a ten-piece funk "orchestra". The album is a combination of breaks and funk covers performed with real instruments, and featuring the vocals of band member Mixmaster Wolf. All tracks were produced by This Kid Named Miles.

Track listing
 "Eight Bar Segment Intro 1"
 "Eight Bar Segment Intro 2"
 "Eight Bar Segment Intro 3"
 "Eight Bar Segment Intro 4"
 "Eight Bar Segment Intro 5"
 "Eight Bar Segment Intro 6"
 "Eight Bar Segment Intro 7"
 "Eight Bar Segment Intro 8"
 "Eight Bar Segment Intro 9"
 "Funky Drummer"
 Contains a sample from:
 "Funky Drummer" performed by James Brown
 "Crumbs Off The Table"
 Contains a sample from:
 "Crumbs Off The Table" performed by Laura Lee
 "Sister Sanctified"
 Contains a sample from:
 "Sister Sanctified" performed by Stanley Turrentine
 "Hook N' Sling"
 Contains a sample from:
 "Hook N' Sling" performed by Eddie Bo
 "Sing A Simple Song"
 Contains a sample from:
 "Sing A Simple Song" performed by Sly & The Family Stone
 "Sexy Coffee Pot"
 Contains a sample from:
 "Sexy Coffee Pot" performed by Tony Alvon & The Belairs
 "I Got Love"
 Contains a sample from:
 "I Got Love" performed by Charles Wright & the Watts 103rd Street Rhythm Band
 "Baby Don't Cry"
 Contains a sample from:
 "Baby Don't Cry" performed by Third Guitar
 "Inner City Blues"
 Contains a sample from:
 "Inner City Blues" performed by Reuben Wilson
 "Cramp Your Style"
 Contains a sample from:
 "Cramp Your Style" performed by All The People
 "Champ"
 Contains a sample from:
 "Champ" performed by the Mohawks
 "Hot Pants, I'm Comin'"
 Contains a sample from:
 "Hot Pants, I'm Comin'" performed by Bobby Byrd
 "Sad Chicken"
 Contains a sample from:
 "Sad Chicken" performed by Leroy & The Drivers
 "Remember Who You Are"
 Contains a sample from:
 "Remember Who You Are" performed by Sly & The Family Stone
 "Humpty Dump"
 Contains a sample from:
 "Humpty Dump" performed by Vibrettes
 "Burning Spear"
 Contains a sample from:
 "Burning Spear" performed by S.O.U.L.
 "Showbiz Interlude"
 "Soul Power '74"
 Contains a sample from:
 "Soul Power '74" performed by Maceo & The Macks
 "Getcho Soul Together, Pt. 1"
 "Getcho Soul Together, Pt. 2"

Credits
 Drums: Josh Cohen
 Flute: Double G
 Alto saxophone: Double G
 Tenor saxophone: Double G
 Baritone saxophone: Double G
 Organ: Carlos Guaico
 Fender rhodes: Carlos Guaico
 Bass: Miles Om Tackett
 Violin: Miles Om Tackett, Amir Yaghmai
 Cello: Miles Om Tackett, Amir Yaghmai
 Guitar: Dan Ubick
 Mixing: Miles Om Tackett

Reception 

Ron Hart of  Billboard gave the album a positive review, saying "As good as it may be, 'Live Mix' is no substitute for the originals. But if you're in search of the best driving music of 2001, peep no further than this right here." Stanton Swihart of Allmusic gave the album 4 stars, saying the album was "A bit rough in spots, but no matter -- funk is supposed to be messy. And this album is funk to the bone."

References

External links 
 Breakestra official site

2001 albums
Breakestra albums
Stones Throw Records albums